Løgumkloster Municipality named for the town Løgumkloster, existed until 1 January 2007, covering an area of 200 km2 and with a total population of 6,846 (2005). Its last mayor was Kaj Armann, a member of the Venstre (Liberal Party)  political party.
 Bedsted Parish
 Højst Parish
 Løgumkloster Parish
 Nørre Løgum Parish.

Løgumkloster Municipality ceased to exist due to Kommunalreformen ("The Municipality Reform" of 2007).  It was merged with Bredebro, Højer, Nørre-Rangstrup, Skærbæk, and Tønder municipalities to form an enlarged Tønder municipality.  This created a municipality with an area of 1,352 km2 and a total population of 42,645 (2005).

Former municipalities of Denmark